Justin Pierre James Trudeau  (born December 25, 1971) is a Canadian politician serving as the 23rd and current prime minister of Canada since 2015 and leader of the Liberal Party since 2013. Trudeau is the second-youngest prime minister in Canadian history after Joe Clark; he is also the first to be the child of a previous holder of the post, as the eldest son of Pierre Trudeau.

Trudeau was born in Ottawa and attended Collège Jean-de-Brébeuf. He graduated from McGill University in 1994 with a Bachelor of Arts degree in literature, then in 1998 acquired a Bachelor of Education degree from the University of British Columbia. After graduating he taught at the secondary school level in Vancouver, before relocating back to Montreal in 2002 to further his studies. He was chair for the youth charity Katimavik and director of the not-for-profit Canadian Avalanche Association. In 2006, he was appointed as chair of the Liberal Party's Task Force on Youth Renewal.

In the 2008 federal election, he was elected to represent the riding of Papineau in the House of Commons. He was the Liberal Party's Official Opposition critic for youth and multiculturalism in 2009, and the following year he became critic for citizenship and immigration. In 2011, he was appointed as a critic for secondary education and sport. Trudeau won the leadership of the Liberal Party in April 2013 and led his party to victory in the 2015 federal election, moving the third-placed Liberals from 36 seats to 184 seats, the largest-ever numerical increase by a party in a Canadian federal election.

Major government initiatives he undertook during his first term as prime minister included legalizing recreational marijuana through the Cannabis Act; attempting Senate appointment reform by establishing the Independent Advisory Board for Senate Appointments and establishing the federal carbon tax. In foreign policy, Trudeau's government negotiated trade deals such as the Canada-United States-Mexico Agreement (CUSMA) and the Comprehensive and Progressive Agreement for Trans-Pacific Partnership, and signed the Paris Agreement on climate change. He was sanctioned by Canada's ethics commissioner for violating conflict of interest rules regarding the Aga Khan affair, and later again with the SNC-Lavalin affair.

Trudeau led the Liberals to consecutive minority governments in the 2019 and 2021 federal elections, during which his government has responded to the COVID-19 pandemic.  During his second term he announced an "assault-style" weapons ban in response to the 2020 Nova Scotia attacks. He was investigated for a third time by the ethics commissioner for his part in the WE Charity scandal, but was cleared of wrongdoing.  In 2022, he invoked the Emergencies Act in response to the Freedom Convoy protests, the first time the act was brought into force since it was enacted in 1988.

Early life

Ancestry and birth
On June 23, 1971, the Prime Minister's Office (PMO) announced that Prime Minister Pierre Trudeau's wife of four months, the former Margaret Sinclair, was pregnant and due in December. Justin Trudeau was born on December 25, 1971, at 9:27 pm EST at the Ottawa Civic Hospital. He is the second child in Canadian history to be born to a prime minister in office; the first was John A. Macdonald's daughter Margaret Mary Theodora Macdonald (February 8, 1869 – January 28, 1933). Trudeau's younger brothers Alexandre (Sacha) (born December 25, 1973) and Michel (October 2, 1975 – November 13, 1998) were the third and fourth.

Trudeau is predominantly of Scottish and French Canadian descent. His grandfathers were businessman Charles-Émile Trudeau and Scottish-born James Sinclair, who was minister of fisheries in the cabinet of Prime Minister Louis St. Laurent. Trudeau's maternal great-grandfather Thomas Bernard was born in Makassar, Indonesia and immigrated to Penticton, British Columbia, in 1906 at age 15 with his family. Through the Bernard family, kinsmen of the Earls of Bandon, Trudeau is the fifth great-grandson of Major-General William Farquhar, a leader in the founding of modern Singapore; Trudeau also has remote ethnic Malaccan and Nias ancestry.

Trudeau was baptized with his father's niece Anne Rouleau-Danis as godmother and his mother's brother-in-law Thomas Walker as godfather, at Ottawa's Notre Dame Basilica on the afternoon of January 16, 1972, which marked his first public appearance. and given the names "Justin Pierre James". On April 14, 1972, Trudeau's father and mother hosted a gala at the National Arts Centre, at which visiting U.S. president Richard Nixon said, "I'd like to toast the future prime minister of Canada, to Justin Pierre Trudeau" to which Pierre Trudeau responded that should his son ever assume the role, he hoped he would have "the grace and skill of the president". Earlier that same day U.S. first lady Pat Nixon had come to see him in his nursery to deliver a gift, a stuffed toy Snoopy. Nixon's White House audio tapes later revealed Nixon referred to that visit as "wasting three days up there. That trip we needed like a hole in the head."

Childhood
Trudeau's parents announced their separation on May 27, 1977, when he was five years old; his father was given primary custody. There had been repeated rumours of a reconciliation for many years afterwards. However, his mother's attorney Michael Levine filed in Toronto to the Supreme Court of Ontario for a no-fault divorce on November 16, 1983, which was finalized on April 2, 1984; his father had announced his intention to retire as prime minister on February 29 of that year. Eventually his parents came to an amicable joint-custody arrangement and learned to get along quite well. Interviewed in October 1979, his nanny Dianne Lavergne was quoted, "Justin is a mommy's boy, so it's not easy, but children's hurts mend very quickly. And they're lucky kids, anyway." Of his mother and father's marriage, Trudeau said in 2009, "They loved each other incredibly, passionately, completely. But there was 30 years between them, and my mom never was an equal partner in what encompassed my father's life, his duty, his country." Trudeau has three half-siblings, Kyle and Alicia, from his mother's remarriage to Fried Kemper, and Sarah, from his father's relationship with Deborah Coyne.

Trudeau lived at 24 Sussex Drive, Ottawa, the official residence of Canada's prime minister, from his birth until his father's government was defeated in the federal election on May 22, 1979. The Trudeaus were expected to move into Stornoway, the residence of the leader of the Official Opposition, but because of flooding in the basement, Prime Minister Joe Clark offered them Harrington Lake, the prime minister's official country retreat in Gatineau Park, with the expectation they would move into Stornoway at the start of July. However, the repairs were not complete, so Pierre Trudeau took a prolonged vacation with his sons to the Nova Scotia summer home of his friend, Member of Parliament Don Johnston, and later sent his sons to stay with their maternal grandparents in North Vancouver for the rest of the summer while he slept at his friend's Ottawa apartment. Justin and his brothers returned to Ottawa for the start of the school year but lived only on the top floor of Stornoway while repairs continued on the bottom floor. His mother purchased and moved into a new home nearby at 95 Victoria Street in Ottawa's New Edinburgh neighbourhood in September 1979. Pierre Trudeau and his sons returned to the prime minister's official residence after the February 1980 election that returned him to the Prime Minister's Office.

His father had intended Trudeau to begin his formal education at a French-language lycée, but Trudeau's mother convinced his father of the importance of sending their sons to a public school. In the end, Trudeau was enrolled in 1976 in the French immersion program at Rockcliffe Park Public School, the same school his mother had attended for two years while her father was a member of Parliament. He could have been dropped off by limousine, but his parents elected he take the school bus albeit with a Royal Canadian Mounted Police (RCMP) car following. This was followed by one year at the private Lycée Claudel d'Ottawa.

After his father's retirement in June 1984, his mother remained at her New Edinburgh home while the rest of the family moved into his father's home at 1418 Pine Avenue, Montreal known as Cormier House, where the following autumn he began attending the private Collège Jean-de-Brébeuf, his father's alma mater. The school had begun as a Jesuit school but was non-denominational by the time Justin matriculated. In 2008, Trudeau said that of all his early family outings he enjoyed camping with his father the most, because "that was where our father got to be just our father – a dad in the woods". During the summers his father would send him and his brothers to Camp Ahmek, on Canoe Lake in Algonquin Provincial Park, where he would later work in his first paid job as a camp counsellor.

Trudeau and his brothers were given shares in a numbered company by their father, from which they received regular dividends, up to $20,000 per year. As of August 2011, Trudeau's company had assets of $1.2 million.

University and early career
Trudeau has a bachelor of arts degree in literature from McGill University and a bachelor of education degree from the University of British Columbia. In his first year at McGill, Trudeau became acquainted with his future principal secretary, Gerald Butts, through their mutual friend, Jonathan Ablett. Butts invited Trudeau to join the McGill Debating Union. They bonded while driving back to Montreal after a debate tournament at Princeton University. After graduation, Trudeau stayed in Vancouver where he became a substitute teacher at local schools such as Killarney Secondary and worked permanently as a French and math teacher at the private West Point Grey Academy. He became a roommate at the Douglas Lodge with fellow West Point Grey Academy faculty member and friend Christopher Ingvaldson. From 2002 to 2004, he studied engineering at the École Polytechnique de Montréal, affiliated with Université de Montréal, but did not graduate. He started a master's degree in environmental geography at McGill but withdrew from the program to seek public office.

In August 2000, Justin Trudeau attended the Kokanee Summit in Creston, British Columbia, to raise funds in honour of his brother Michel Trudeau and other avalanche victims. After the event, an unsigned editorial in the Creston Valley Advance (a local newspaper) accused Trudeau of having groped an unnamed female reporter while at the music festival. The editorial stated Trudeau provided a "day-late" apology to the reporter, saying, "If I had known you were reporting for a national paper, I never would have been so forward". In 2018, Trudeau was questioned about the groping incident but said he did not remember any negative incidents from that time. His apology and later statement about the event have been described as hypocritical, while responses to the story have been described as a witch hunt or non-story.

In October 2000, Trudeau, then 28, emerged as a prominent figure after delivering a eulogy at his father's state funeral. The Canadian Broadcasting Corporation (CBC) received numerous calls to rebroadcast the speech after its initial transmission, and leading Quebec politician Claude Ryan described it as "perhaps ... the first manifestation of a dynasty". A book issued by the CBC in 2003 included the speech in its list of significant Canadian events from the past fifty years.

In 2007, Trudeau starred in the two-part CBC Television miniseries The Great War, which gave an account of Canada's participation in the First World War. He portrayed his fifth cousin, twice removed, Major Talbot Mercer Papineau, who was killed on October 30, 1917, during the Battle of Passchendaele. Trudeau is one of several children of former prime ministers who have become Canadian media personalities. The others are Ben Mulroney (son of Brian Mulroney), Catherine Clark (daughter of Joe Clark), and Trudeau's younger brother, Alexandre. Ben Mulroney was a guest at Trudeau's wedding.

Advocacy

Trudeau and his family started the Kokanee Glacier Alpine Campaign for winter sports safety in 2000, two years after his brother Michel died in an avalanche during a ski trip. In 2002, Trudeau criticized the Government of British Columbia's decision to stop its funding for a public avalanche warning system.

From 2002 to 2006, Trudeau chaired the Katimavik youth program, a project started by longtime family friend Jacques Hébert.

In 2002–03, Trudeau was a panelist on CBC Radio's Canada Reads series, where he championed The Colony of Unrequited Dreams by Wayne Johnston. Trudeau and his brother Alexandre inaugurated the Trudeau Centre for Peace and Conflict Studies at the University of Toronto in April 2004; the centre later became a part of the Munk School of Global Affairs. In 2006, he hosted the presentation ceremony for the Giller Prize for literature.

In 2005, Trudeau fought against a proposed $100-million zinc mine that he argued would poison the Nahanni River, a United Nations World Heritage Site located in the Northwest Territories. He was quoted as saying, "The river is an absolutely magnificent, magical place. I'm not saying mining is wrong ... but that is not the place for it. It's just the wrong thing to be doing."

On September 17, 2006, Trudeau was the master of ceremonies at a Toronto rally organized by Roméo Dallaire that called for Canadian participation in resolving the Darfur crisis.

Political beginnings
Trudeau supported the Liberal Party from a young age, offering his support to party leader John Turner in the 1988 federal election. Two years later, he defended Canadian federalism at a student event at the Collège Jean-de-Brébeuf, which he attended.

Following his father's death, Trudeau became more involved with the Liberal Party throughout the 2000s. Along with Olympian Charmaine Crooks, he co-hosted a tribute to outgoing prime minister Jean Chrétien at the party's 2003 leadership convention, and was appointed to chair a task force on youth renewal after the party's defeat in the 2006 federal election.

In October 2006, Trudeau criticized Quebec nationalism by describing political nationalism generally as an "old idea from the 19th century", "based on a smallness of thought" and not relevant to modern Quebec. This comment was seen as a criticism of Michael Ignatieff, then a candidate in the 2006 Liberal Party leadership election, who was promoting recognition of Quebec as a nation. Trudeau later wrote a public letter on the subject, describing the idea of Quebec nationhood as "against everything my father ever believed".

Trudeau announced his support for leadership candidate Gerard Kennedy shortly before the 2006 convention and introduced Kennedy during the candidates' final speeches. When Kennedy dropped off after the second ballot, Trudeau joined him in supporting the ultimate winner, Stéphane Dion.

Rumours circulated in early 2007 that Trudeau would run in an upcoming by-election in the Montreal riding of Outremont. The Montreal newspaper La Presse reported despite Trudeau's keenness, Liberal leader Stéphane Dion wanted Outremont for a star candidate who could help rebuild the Liberal Party. Instead, Trudeau announced that he would seek the Liberal nomination in the nearby riding of Papineau for the next general election. The riding, which had been held for 26 years by André Ouellet, a senior minister under his father, had been in Liberal hands for 53 years before falling to the Bloc Québécois in 2006.

On April 29, 2007, Trudeau won the Liberal party's nomination, picking up 690 votes to 350 for Deros and 220 for Giordano against Mary Deros, a Montreal city councillor and Basilio Giordano, the publisher of a local Italian-language newspaper.

Opposition, 2008–2015
Prime Minister Stephen Harper called an election for October 14, 2008, by which time Trudeau had been campaigning for a year in Papineau. On election day, Trudeau narrowly defeated Bloc Québécois incumbent Vivian Barbot. Following his election win, Edward Greenspon, editor-in-chief of The Globe and Mail, noted that Trudeau would "be viewed as few other rookie MPs are—as a potential future Prime Minister—and scrutinized through that lens".

The Conservative Party won a minority government in the 2008 election, and Trudeau entered parliament as a member of the Official Opposition. Trudeau's first legislative act was a motion that called for the creation of a "national voluntary service policy for young people". He later co-chaired the Liberal Party's April 2009 national convention in Vancouver, and in October of the same year he was appointed as the party's critic for multiculturalism and youth.

In September 2010, he was reassigned as critic for youth, citizenship, and immigration. During that time, he criticized the government's legislation targeting human smuggling, which he argued would penalize the victims of smuggling.

Trudeau sparked controversy when it was revealed that he earned $1.3 million in public speaking fees from charities and school boards across Canada, $277,000 of which Trudeau received after becoming an MP.

He encouraged an increase of Canada's relief efforts after the 2010 Haiti earthquake, and sought more accessible immigration procedures for Haitians moving to Canada in the time of crisis. His own riding includes a significant Haitian community.

Trudeau was re-elected in Papineau in the 2011 federal election, as the Liberal Party fell to third-party standing in the House of Commons with only thirty-four seats. Ignatieff resigned as party leader immediately after the election, and rumours again circulated that Trudeau could run to become his successor. On this occasion, Trudeau said, "I don't feel I should be closing off any options ... because of the history packaged into my name, a lot of people are turning to me in a way that ... to be blunt, concerns me." Weeks after the election, Toronto MP Bob Rae was selected as the interim leader until the party's leadership convention, which was later decided to be held in April 2013. Rae appointed Trudeau as the party's critic for post-secondary education, youth and amateur sport. After his re-election, he travelled the country hosting fundraisers for charities and the Liberal Party.

Trudeau wanted to take part in a charity boxing match on behalf of the cancer research fundraising event Fight for the Cure, but was having difficulty finding a Conservative opponent until Conservative senator Patrick Brazeau agreed when asked on Trudeau's behalf by their mutual hairdresser Stefania Capovilla. The fight on March 31, 2012, in Ottawa at the Hampton Inn was broadcast live on Sun News with commentary by Ezra Levant and Brian Lilley and Trudeau won in the third round, the result considered an upset.

Leader of the Liberal Party

Earlier speculation
After Dion's resignation as Liberal leader in 2008, Trudeau's name was mentioned as a potential candidate with polls showing him as a favourite among Canadians for the position.

However, Trudeau did not enter the race and Ignatieff was named leader in December 2008. After the party's poor showing in the 2011 election, Ignatieff resigned from the leadership and Trudeau was again seen as a potential candidate to lead the party.

Following the election, Trudeau said he was undecided about seeking the leadership; months later on October 12 at Wilfrid Laurier University, he announced he would not seek the post because he had a young family. When interim leader Bob Rae, who was also seen as a frontrunner, announced he would not be entering the race in June 2012, Trudeau was hit with a "tsunami" of calls from supporters to reconsider his earlier decision to not seek the leadership.

Opinion polling conducted by several pollsters showed that if Trudeau were to become leader the Liberal Party would surge in support, from a distant third place to either being competitive with the Conservative Party or leading them. In July 2012, Trudeau stated that he would reconsider his earlier decision to not seek the leadership and would announce his final decision at the end of the summer.

2013 leadership election

On September 26, 2012, multiple media outlets started reporting that Trudeau would launch his leadership bid the following week. While Trudeau was seen as a frontrunner for the leadership of the Liberal Party, he was criticized for his perceived lack of substance. During his time as a member of Parliament, he spoke little on policy matters and it was not known where he stood on many issues such as the economy and foreign affairs. Some strategists and pundits believed the leadership would be the time for Trudeau to be tested on these issues; however, there was also fear within the party that his celebrity status and large lead might deter other strong candidates from entering the leadership race.

On October 2, 2012, Trudeau held a rally in Montreal to launch his bid for the leadership of the Liberal Party. The core people on his campaign team were considered longtime friends, and all in their 30s and 40s. His senior advisor was Gerald Butts, the former president of WWF-Canada who had previously been principal secretary to former Ontario premier Dalton McGuinty. Other senior aides included campaign manager Katie Telford, and policy advisors Mike McNeir and Robert Asselin, who had all worked for recent Liberal Party leaders. His brother Alexandre also took a break from his documentary work to be a senior advisor on Trudeau's campaign.

During the leadership campaign three by-elections were held on November 26, 2012. The riding Calgary Centre was expected to be a three-way race between the Conservatives, Liberals and Green Party. A week before by-election day Sun Media reported on comments Trudeau had made in a 2010 interview with Télé-Québec, in which he said, "Canada isn't doing well right now because it's Albertans who control our community and socio-democratic agenda." Trudeau's campaign advisor said that the comments were being brought up now because of the close race in Calgary Centre. The following day, Trudeau apologized, saying he was wrong to use "Alberta" as "shorthand" in referring to Stephen Harper's government. The Conservatives held onto Calgary Centre in the by-election by less than 1,200 votes. Liberal candidate Harvey Locke said he lost the by-election on his own and that comments made by Trudeau did not influence the outcome.

Fellow leadership candidate Marc Garneau, seen as Trudeau's main challenger in the race, criticized Trudeau for not releasing enough substantial policy positions. Garneau called on him to release more detailed policies before members and supporters begin to vote. Garneau later challenged Trudeau to a one-on-one debate, and said that if Trudeau could not defend his ideas in a debate against him, he wouldn't be able to do so against Prime Minister Harper. Trudeau clashed in debates with challenger Joyce Murray, who was the only Liberal leadership candidate to speak out strongly in favour of electing the House of Commons with a system of proportional representation. She challenged Trudeau over his support for a preferential ballot voting system.

On March 13, 2013, Garneau dropped out of the leadership race, saying that polling conducted by his campaign showed he would be unable to defeat Trudeau.

With Joyce Murray, the last challenger, receiving significant press time, more Liberal politicians and public figures declared themselves for Trudeau. Trudeau was declared the winner of the leadership election on April 14, 2013, garnering 80.1 per cent of 30,800 votes. Joyce Murray finished in second place with 10.2 per cent points, ahead of Martha Hall Findlay's 5.7 per cent. Trudeau had lost only five ridings, all to Murray and all in BC.

Leadership, 2013–2015

In the days following his victory in the leadership race, snapshot polls recorded a surge in support for the Liberal party.

In 2013, Trudeau chose to give up his seat at the funeral of Nelson Mandela, in deference to Irwin Cotler as representative of the Liberal Party of Canada, because of Cotler's work for and with Nelson Mandela in fighting apartheid.

During the leadership campaign Trudeau pledged to park all his assets, exclusive of real estate holdings, into a blind trust which is atypical for opposition MPs, including leaders. According to documents obtained by the Ottawa Citizen, he fulfilled the pledge in July 2013 when the blind trust was set up by BMO Private Banking.

On January 27, 2014, Trudeau and MP Carolyn Bennett escorted Chrystia Freeland into the House of Commons, as is traditional for by-election victors. Trudeau launched an internet video the week before the 2014 Liberal party convention titled "An economy that benefits us all" in which he narrates his economic platform. He said that Canada's debt to GDP ratios have come down in recent years and now it's time for Ottawa to "step up".

2015 federal election

On October 19, 2015, after the longest official campaign in over a century, Trudeau led the Liberals to a decisive victory in the federal election. The Liberals won 184 of the 338 seats, with 39.5% of the popular vote, for a strong majority government; a gain of 150 seats compared to the 2011 federal election.

This was the second-best performance in the party's history. The Liberals won mostly on the strength of a solid performance in the eastern half of the country. In addition to taking all of Atlantic Canada and Toronto, they won 40 seats in Quebec—the most that the Liberals had won in that province since Trudeau's father led them to a near-sweep of the province in 1980, and also the first time since then that the Liberals won a majority of Quebec's seats in an election. The 150-seat gain was the biggest numerical increase for a single party since Confederation and marked the first time that a party had rebounded from third place in the Commons to a majority government.

In addition to the appeal of his party's platform, Trudeau's success has been credited to his performance both on the campaign trail and televised leaders' debates exceeding the lowered expectations created by Conservative advertisements and conservative media outlets.

Trudeau declared victory shortly after CBC News projected that he had won a majority government. He began his speech with a reference to former Liberal prime minister Wilfrid Laurier's "sunny ways" approach to bringing Canadians together despite their differences. According to Trudeau, Laurier "knew that politics can be a positive force, and that's the message Canadians have sent today". Harper announced his resignation as the leader of the Conservative Party that night.

Prime Minister of Canada (2015–present)

Trudeau and the rest of the Cabinet were sworn in by Governor General David Johnston on November 4, 2015. He said that his first legislative priority was to lower taxes for middle-income Canadians and raise taxes for the top one per cent of income earners after parliament was reconvened on December 3, 2015. Trudeau also issued a statement promising to rebuild relations with Indigenous peoples in Canada and run an open, ethical and transparent government. On November 5, 2015, during the first Liberal caucus meeting since forming a majority government, the party announced that it would reinstate the mandatory long-form census that had been scrapped in 2010, effective with the 2016 census.

Trudeau was criticized by opposition members in November 2016 for his fundraising tactics which they saw as "cash for access" schemes. Trudeau attended fundraisers where attendees paid an upward of $1500 for access to him and other cabinet members. In some instances, the events were attended by foreign businessmen who needed government approval for their businesses. Trudeau defended his fundraising tactics, saying that they were not in breach of any ethics rules. He also stated that he was lobbied at the fundraisers but not influenced. In 2017, Trudeau introduced legislation that would eliminate such exclusive events by requiring increased transparency for political fundraisers.

In January 2017, the ethics commissioner, Mary Dawson, began an investigation into Trudeau for a vacation he and his family took to Aga Khan IV's private island in the Bahamas. The ethics commissioner's report, released in December 2017, found that Trudeau had violated four provisions of the Conflict of Interest Act. He became the first sitting prime minister to break federal conflict of interest rules. In 2022, it was reported that the Royal Canadian Mounted Police had considered bringing criminal charges against Trudeau over the affair.

In February 2018, Trudeau was criticized when his government invited Khalistani nationalist Jaspal Atwal to the Canadian High Commission's dinner party in Delhi. Atwal had previously been convicted for the shooting and attempted murder of Indian Cabinet minister Malkiat Singh Sidhu in 1986, as well as the assault on former BC premier Ujjal Dosanjh in 1985. Following the dinner, the PMO rescinded the invitation, and apologized for the incident.

During his time as Prime Minister, Justin Trudeau has been the target of multiple death threats and assassination plots.

Assessment of campaign promises
In July 2019, a group of 20 independent academics published an assessment on Trudeau's first term as Prime Minister, called Assessing Justin Trudeau's Liberal Government: 353 Promises and a Mandate for Change. The assessment found that Trudeau's Liberal government kept 92 per cent of pledges, including complete and partial pledges. When calculating completed and realized pledges, they found Trudeau's government kept 53.5 per cent of their campaign promises. Trudeau's government, along with the "last Harper government had the highest rates of follow-through on their campaign promises of any Canadian government over the last 35 years," according to the assessment.

SNC-Lavalin affair

On February 8, 2019, The Globe and Mail reported that sources close to the government said that the Prime Minister's Office had allegedly attempted to influence Attorney General Jody Wilson-Raybould concerning an ongoing prosecution of SNC-Lavalin. When asked about the allegations, Trudeau said that the story in the Globe was false and that he had never "directed" Wilson-Raybould concerning the case. Wilson-Raybould did not comment on the matter, citing solicitor-client privilege. Soon after, Trudeau voluntarily waived privilege and cabinet confidences, permitting her to speak. On February 11, the ethics commissioner announced the opening of an investigation into the allegations. Trudeau said he "welcomed the investigation". The Justice Committee of the House of Commons has conducted a series of hearings on the alleged interference. The investigation heard from several witnesses, including Jody Wilson-Raybould, who submitted as evidence a telephone call she secretly recorded between herself and Privy Council Clerk Michael Wernick, which was subsequently released to the public. On the recording, Wernick is heard asking to understand why the "DPA route" is not being used, stating that people were "talking past each other", and suggesting Trudeau obtain independent legal advice from former Supreme Court chief justice Beverly McLachlin. Wilson-Raybould is heard suggesting that Trudeau would be "breaching a constitutional principle of prosecutorial independence". On March 19, 2019, the Liberal committee members voted as a bloc to shut down the Justice Committee's investigation.

Trudeau was the subject of an investigation by the ethics commissioner, pursuant to the Conflict of Interest Act, in regards to criminal charges against SNC-Lavalin in the SNC-Lavalin affair. The commission's final report, issued August 14, 2019, concluded "Mr. Trudeau contravened section 9 of the Act".

2019 federal election

On September 11, 2019, Trudeau visited Governor General Julie Payette, to request the dissolution of Parliament, and formally triggering an election. Prior to the formal start of the campaign, Trudeau announced his intention to only participate in the three leaders' debates, two organized by the Leaders' Debates Commission, and one organized by TVA. Other leader's debates were either cancelled or took place with an empty podium left on stage for Trudeau.

In September 2019, controversial pictures and video were published showing Trudeau in brownface and blackface. On September 18, 2019, Time magazine published a photograph of Trudeau wearing brownface makeup in the spring of 2001, at an Arabian Nights-themed gala, while Trudeau was a teacher at West Point Grey Academy. Trudeau publicly apologized, agreeing the photo was racist and saying: "I shouldn't have done that. I should have known better and I didn't. I'm really sorry." He further went on to say "It was something that I didn't think was racist at the time, but now I recognize it was something racist to do". Trudeau also admitted to wearing blackface makeup in high school while singing "Day-O" at a talent show that was subsequently published by Global News. A third instance, a video, of Trudeau in racist dress was also published. After this video was published, Trudeau admitted he could not remember how often he had worn blackface makeup. In the days following the scandal, pollsters pointed out that many Canadians either were not bothered by the scandal or had accepted Trudeau's apology. Additionally, some minority community groups, racialized commentators and some of Trudeau's opponents came to his defence. Others were more critical, including members of his own party.

2019 election results

While Trudeau's Liberal Party lost 20 seats in the House of Commons (lowering its total from 177 to 157) from the time of dissolution, they still won the most seats of any party—enough seats to allow Trudeau to form a minority government. For the first time since 1979, the party that garnered the largest share of the national popular vote did not win the most seats; the Liberals under Trudeau had 33.1 per cent of the popular vote, while the Conservatives under Andrew Scheer had 34.4 per cent. It was also the first time a government took power with less than 35 per cent of the national popular vote since the Conservatives of John A. Macdonald, in 1867, who had 34.8 per cent of the votes. In Alberta and Saskatchewan, the Liberal party won 14 per cent and 10 per cent of the popular vote, respectively. In Ontario, Liberals won all 25 Toronto seats and 24 of 29 seats in the surrounding suburbs of the Greater Toronto Area—reportedly due in part to the unpopularity of the Progressive Conservative party government of Premier Doug Ford.

COVID-19 pandemic

Justin Trudeau was Prime Minister during the worldwide COVID-19 pandemic. His government's response to the pandemic included funds for provinces and territories to adapt to the new situation, funds for coronavirus research, travel restrictions, screening of international flights, self-isolation orders under the Quarantine Act, an industrial strategy, and a public health awareness campaign. Initially, Canada faced a shortage of personal protective equipment, as the Trudeau government had cut PPE stockpile funding in the previous years.

To deal with the economic impact of the pandemic in 2020, Trudeau waived student loan payments, increased the Canada Child Benefit, doubled the annual Goods and Services Tax payment, and introduced the Canada Emergency Response Benefit (CERB) as part of a first package in March. In April 2020, Trudeau introduced the Canada Emergency Wage Subsidy, the Canada Emergency Business Account, and the Canada Emergency Student Benefit. Trudeau also deployed the Canadian Forces in long-term care homes in Quebec and Ontario as part of Operation LASER.

Throughout the pandemic, the federal government was also responsible for the procurement of COVID-19 vaccines. On May 12, 2020, the Trudeau government announced it had reached an exclusive deal with CanSino Biologics. However, due to deteriorating Canadian-Chinese relations, the Cansino deal fell through. On August 5, 2020, the Trudeau government created a plan to secure doses of the Pfizer and Moderna vaccines. Starting in December 2020, Justin Trudeau oversaw the implementation of Canada's mass-vaccination program.

The spread of COVID-19 in Canada continued beyond the initial outbreak, with a strong second wave in the fall of 2020 and an even more serious third wave in the spring of 2021. Throughout the crisis, Trudeau periodically extended the scope and duration of the federal aid programs. The 2021 Canadian federal budget planned to phase them out by the end of September 2021, and projected a $354.2-billion deficit in the 2020-21 fiscal year. While CERB was indeed phased out on September 26, the Canada Recovery Benefit (CBR) continued to provide support until October 23. The Canada Worker Lockdown Benefit was introduced that month to replace the CBR, and expanded during the spread of the Omicron variant in December 2021.

WE Charity ethics investigation

Following complaints by opposition parties that the Trudeau family had ties to WE Charity, the ethics commissioner on July 3, 2020, announced an investigation into Trudeau's and the government's decision to have the charity administer a summer, student-grant program which could assist students financially during the COVID-19 pandemic. Trudeau responded by saying WE was the charity that had the capability to administer such a program. WE and the federal government decided to "part ways" leaving administration of the grant program to the federal government.

We Charity was criticized for its close ties to the Trudeau family; the investigation came after revelations that Trudeau's mother, brother, and wife were paid nearly $300,000 in total to speak at WE Charity events.
On July 16, 2020, the ethics commissioner also announced the investigation was being expanded to include Finance Minister Bill Morneau. Trudeau was ultimately cleared of any wrongdoing by the ethics commissioner though Morneau was found to have broken the conflict of interest law.

2021 federal election 

On August 15, 2021, Trudeau advised Governor General Mary Simon to dissolve parliament, scheduling an election for September 20. The election was called on the same day as the Fall of Kabul. In the first two weeks of the campaign, Trudeau received criticism for not acting fast enough in the face of the 2021 Taliban offensive to evacuate Canadian citizens and Afghans who supported Canada’s military and diplomatic efforts during the War in Afghanistan.

In the 2021 federal election, Trudeau secured a third mandate and his second minority government after winning 160 seats. However, the Liberals came in second in the national popular vote, behind the Conservatives. They received 32.6 percent of the popular vote, the lowest percentage of the national popular vote for a governing party in Canadian history.

2022 convoy protest 

The Canada convoy protest, called the Freedom Convoy, was a protest in Canada against COVID-19 vaccine requirements for truckers to re-enter the country by land introduced by the Government of Canada on January 15, 2022. Originally composed of several routes traversing all of the Canadian provinces, the truck convoys converged on Ottawa.

On January 29, the first day of protest at Parliament Hill, Prime Minister Trudeau moved to an undisclosed location.

According to The Guardian, the demonstration developed to express a number of "antigovernment grievances", particularly against Trudeau.

On January 31, Trudeau called the protests an "insult to truth". On February 3, he said that a military response was "not in the cards right now".

On February 11, Reuters reported that Trudeau promised the US "quick action" regarding protesters who have forcefully blocked the Ambassador Bridge on the US-Canada border, the continent's busiest land border crossing." Trudeau subsequently indicated that there would be "robust police intervention" and called for all protesters to "go home."

Trudeau invoked the Emergencies Act on February 14, 2022 for the first time since it was enacted in 1988, as a result of the public order emergency caused by the demonstrations in Ottawa. On February 23, 2022, Trudeau announced that the federal government would revoke the emergency declaration. Later that day, the governor general signed a proclamation revoking it.  A year later, on February 17, 2023, a judicial inquiry into the use of the Emergencies Act concluded that the Trudeau government met the legal threshold required to invoke the act.

China election interference 

In late 2022, various media outlets around the world reported on a suspected attempt by the People's Republic of China to infiltrate the Parliament of Canada by funding a network of candidates to run in the country’s 2019 federal election.  In response to the allegations, Trudeau said, "I do not have any information, nor have I been briefed on any federal candidates receiving any money from China".

After facing increasing calls for a public inquiry into the allegations by opposition parties, former advisors, and the former Chief Electoral Officer, on March 6, 2023, Trudeau instructed National Security and Intelligence Committee of Parliamentarians (NSICOP) to investigate foreign interference in Canada, with a special eye on election meddling. He also announced that he would be appointing a special rapporteur to "make expert recommendations on protecting and enhancing Canadians’ faith in our democracy". During the press conference Trudeau said that his government had not acted on many of the recommendations made in previous reports from NSICOP. In its 2021 review, provided to Trudeau in May 2022, the body had asked the government to respond to the recommendations made in its previous seven reviews. In March 2023 Trudeau said that his government would now respond to those recommendations within 30 days.

Faced with questions from reporters on March 8, Trudeau said "I know that no matter what I say, Canadians continue to have questions about what [the government] did and what we didn't".

On March 15, Trudeau named former governor general David Johnston as special rapporteur "[t]asked with helping protect the integrity of Canada's democracy."

Policies

Domestic policy

The Trudeau government's economic policy initially relied on increased tax revenues to pay for increased government spending. While the government did not balance the budget in its first term, it reduced Canada's debt-to-GDP ratio every year until 2020, when the COVID-19 pandemic hit. Trudeau's self-described progressive and feminist social policy has included strong advocacy for abortion rights. His government introduced the bill that made conversion therapies illegal in Canada.

In his first term, Canada set targets to welcome an increased number of immigrants and refugees. Canada introduced the right to medically-assisted dying in 2016 and legalized cannabis for recreational use in 2018. In 2021, Trudeau announced the creation of a national child care plan with the intention of reducing day care fees for parents down to $10 a day per child within five years.

His environmental policy included introducing new commitments to reducing greenhouse gas emissions by 30% before 2030, and to achieve net-zero emissions by 2050. His main tool for reaching this target is a federal carbon pricing policy. Trudeau's parliament also adopted legislation for marine conservation, banning six common single-use plastic products, and strengthening environmental impact assessments. Trudeau pledged to ban single use plastic in 2019. In the year 2022 his government announced a ban on producing and importing single use plastic from December 2022. The sale of those items will be banned from December 2023 and the export from 2025. However, Trudeau is in favour of oil and gas pipelines to bring Canadian fossil fuel resources to foreign markets.

Foreign policy

In 2015, Trudeau  told the New York Times Magazine that Canada could be the “first postnational state".

Trudeau enjoyed good relations with the "like-minded" United States president Barack Obama, despite Trudeau's support for the Keystone Pipeline which was rejected by the Democratic president. Trudeau's first foreign policy challenges included follow-through on his campaign promise to withdraw Canadian air support from the Syrian civil war and to welcome 25,000 Syrian war refugees.
When Donald Trump became president, Canada-US relations deteriorated. The Trump administration forced the renegotiation of NAFTA to create the CUSMA, in which Canada made significant concessions in allowing increased imports of American milk, weakening Canada's dairy supply management system. Donald Trump also implemented tariffs on Canadian steel and aluminium, to which Trudeau retaliated by imposing tariffs on American steel, aluminium and a variety of other American products.

Canada's relationship with China also deteriorated during Justin Trudeau's time as Prime Minister. The turmoil led to the arrest of Meng Wanzhou at the Vancouver International Airport in December 2018 at the behest of the United States, and the arrest of Michael Spavor and Michael Kovrig in China 12 days later. As these three individuals were released at the exact same time in September 2021, many observers speculated they were exchanged as part of a deal between the United States and China.

In a similar fashion, Canada's relationship with Saudi Arabia was also put under strain, as human rights groups called on Trudeau to stop selling military equipment to that country under a deal struck by the Harper government. In 2018, Saudi Arabia recalled its Canadian ambassador and froze trade with the country in response to Canada's call for the Saudis to release opposition blogger Raif Badawi. However, in 2019, Canada doubled its weapons sales to Saudi Arabia, despite a "moratorium on export permits following the killing of the Saudi journalist Jamal Khashoggi and mounting civilian deaths from the Saudi Arabian-led intervention in Yemen."

In 2020, Canada lost its bid to join the United Nations Security Council. This was the second time Canada had failed an attempt to join the Security Council, the first time being in 2009 under Prime Minister Stephen Harper.

Personal life

Family

Trudeau first met Sophie Grégoire when they were both children growing up in Montreal; Grégoire was a classmate and childhood friend of Trudeau's youngest brother, Michel. They reconnected as adults in June 2003, when Grégoire, by then a Quebec television personality, was assigned as Trudeau's co-host for a charity ball; they began dating several months later. Trudeau and Grégoire became engaged in October 2004 and married on May 28, 2005, in a ceremony at Montreal's Sainte-Madeleine d'Outremont Church. They have three children: a boy Xavier born in 2007, a girl Ella-Grace born in 2009, and a boy Hadrien born in 2014.

In June 2013, two months after Trudeau became the leader of the Liberal Party, the couple sold their home in the Côte-des-Neiges neighbourhood of Montreal. They began living in a rented home in Ottawa's Rockcliffe Park, the neighbourhood near where Trudeau resided as a child during his father's time as prime minister.

On August 18, 2014, an intruder broke into the house while Grégoire and the couple's three children were sleeping and left a threatening note; however, nothing was stolen and there was no damage to the property. Following the incident, Trudeau, who was in Winnipeg at the time of the break-in, stated his intention to inquire with the Royal Canadian Mounted Police about his home security. After his 2015 electoral victory, Trudeau opted to live at Rideau Cottage, on the grounds of Rideau Hall.

On March 12, 2020, the Trudeau family self-isolated at Rideau Cottage after Sophie began exhibiting flu-like symptoms and later tested positive for COVID-19. By March 28, she had recovered.

On January 31, 2022, Trudeau announced on Twitter that he tested positive for COVID-19.

On June 13, 2022, Trudeau tested positive for COVID-19 for the second time.

Religion
Trudeau's father was a devout Catholic and his mother converted from Anglicanism to Catholicism just before their wedding. Trudeau himself became a lapsed Catholic at age 18, as he felt that much of his day-to-day life was not addressed by the formality and structure of the church. Trudeau described his faith during this period as "like so many Catholics across this country, I said, 'OK, I'm Catholic, I'm of faith, but I'm just not really going to go to church. Maybe on Easter, maybe midnight Mass at Christmas. After the death of his brother Michel in 1998, Trudeau was persuaded by a friend to participate in an Alpha course, during which he regained his faith. In 2011, Trudeau stated, "My own personal faith is an extremely important part of who I am and the values that I try to lead with."

Honours
110px

Honorary degrees

Electoral record

Published works

 Trudeau, Justin (October 20, 2014). Common Ground. HarperCollins Canada. . .

Footnotes

References

External links

 
 Liberal Party of Canada profile
 
 House of Commons profile
 
 
 
 
 

 
1971 births
21st-century Canadian politicians
Anglophone Quebec people
Canadian feminists
Canadian people of Anglo-Irish descent
Canadian people of English descent
Canadian people of French descent
Canadian people of Scottish descent
Canadian Roman Catholics
Canadian schoolteachers
Catholic feminists
Children of prime ministers of Canada
Franco-Ontarian people
French Quebecers
Leaders of the Liberal Party of Canada
Liberal Party of Canada leadership candidates
Liberal Party of Canada MPs
Living people
McGill University alumni
Members of the 29th Canadian Ministry
Members of the House of Commons of Canada from Quebec
Members of the King's Privy Council for Canada
Pierre Trudeau
Politicians from Montreal
Politicians from Ottawa
Prime Ministers of Canada
Justin
University of British Columbia Faculty of Education alumni